La Vie Qui Bat is a Canadian nature television series which aired on Télévision de Radio-Canada from 1955 to 1965, and was seen on the English CBC Television service in 1968.

Premise
This Montreal-produced series featured a combination of documentaries concerning animals and nature.

Scheduling
This half-hour series was broadcast from 1955 to 1965 on Radio-Canada. The series was rebroadcast on CBC Television's English network Tuesdays at 5:30 p.m. from 23 July to 27 September 1968.

References

CBC Television original programming
Ici Radio-Canada Télé original programming
1955 Canadian television series debuts
1965 Canadian television series endings
Television shows filmed in Montreal
1950s Canadian documentary television series
1960s Canadian documentary television series
Black-and-white Canadian television shows